Diane may refer to:

People
Diane (given name)

Film
 Diane (1929 film), a German silent film
 Diane (1956 film), a historical drama film starring Lana Turner
 Diane (2017 film), a mystery film directed by Michael Mongillo
 Diane (2018 film), a drama film starring Mary Kay Place

Music
 Diane (album), by Chet Baker and Paul Bley, 1985
 "Diane" (Cam song), 2017
 "Diane" (Erno Rapee and Lew Pollack song), a 1927 composition covered by many, including a 1964 UK #1 by The Bachelors
 "Diane" (Hüsker Dü song), 1983
 "Diane", a song by Guster from Keep It Together
 "Diane", a song by Don Patterson with Sonny Stitt and Billy James from The Boss Men

Other uses
 Diana (mythology), a name of the deity Artemis
 The Dianne, a high-rise residential building in Portland, Oregon, US
 Ethinylestradiol/cyproterone acetate, a birth control pill sold under the brand names Diane and Diane-35
 Group Diane, a former special forces unit of the Belgian gendarmerie
 Hurricane Diane, a disastrous Atlantic hurricane during 1955
 Project DIANE, the Diversified Information and Assistance NEtwork, a U.S. videoconferencing based community service network
 Steak Diane, a culinary dish
 Diane, a sin from The Seven Deadly Sins (2014 TV series)

See also 
 "Oh Diane", a 1982 song by Fleetwood Mac
 Citroën Dyane, a car
 Daiane, a Portuguese feminine given name
 Dian (disambiguation)
 Dianne (disambiguation)
 Dyane, a town in India